The minister-president of the French Community of Belgium is the head of the Government of the French Community of Belgium.

List of officeholders

Timeline

See also
 Prime Minister of Belgium
 Minister-President of the Brussels-Capital Region
 Minister-President of Flanders
 Minister-President of the German-speaking Community
 Minister-President of Wallonia

1981 establishments in Belgium
French Community, Minister-Presidents